This is a list of notable schools in the African country of Libya.

Tripoli 
AMLY School - The American Libyan School
ISM School
Donia El-Ibdaa School

Benghazi

Downtown 
Al-Fateh Center for Gifted Students
Ozo

See also

 Education in Libya
 Lists of schools

External links
List of Libyan Schools

Schools
Schools
Schools
Libya
Libya